Leslie Hyde Townsend (born 4 October 1914 at Sydney, New South Wales, Australia; died 30 January 1986) was an Australian cricket Test match umpire.

He umpired one Test match between Australia and England at Melbourne on 13 February to 18 February 1959, won by Australia by 9 wickets with a century to Colin McDonald and 5 wickets each to Alan Davidson and Richie Benaud. Townsend’s partner in this match was Ron Wright.

See also
Australian Test Cricket Umpires
List of test umpires

External links
 

Australian Test cricket umpires
1914 births
1986 deaths
Musicians Institute alumni